Happiness Runs is a 2010 American drama film written and directed by Adam Sherman and starring Mark L. Young, Hanna R. Hall, Rutger Hauer and Andie MacDowell.

Cast
 Mark Boone Junior as Victor's Father
 Joseph Castanon as 'Little Mackie'
 Richard Edson as Pete
 Shiloh Fernandez as Jake
 John Fleck as Chad's Dad
 Kevin Gage as Hypnotist
 Hanna R. Hall as Becky
 Rutger Hauer as Insley
 Andie MacDowell as Victor's Mother
 Ann Magnuson as Chad's Mom
 Steven Christopher Parker as Tao
 Jesse Plemons as Chad
 Mark L. Young as Victor

Reception
, Happiness Runs holds a 17% approval rating on Rotten Tomatoes, based on twelve reviews with an average rating on 3.33/10.  Christian Blauvelt of Slant Magazine awarded the film three stars out of four.  Stephen Garrett of Time Out awarded the film one star out of five.

References

External links
 
 

American drama films
2010 drama films
2010 films
2010s English-language films
2010s American films